Bang Saphan Noi station is a railway station in Bang Saphan Subdistrict, Bang Saphan Noi District, Prachuap Khiri Khan. It is a class 2 railway station,  from Thon Buri Railway Station.

Train services 
 Rapid No. 167/168 Bangkok-Kantang-Bangkok
 Rapid No. 173/174 Bangkok-Nakhon Si Thammarat-Bangkok
 Rapid No. 177/178 Thon Buri-Lang Suan-Thon Buri
 Ordinary No. 254/255 Lang Suan-Thon Buri-Lang Suan

References 
 
 

Railway stations in Thailand